Zoltán Farkas may refer to:

 Zoltán Farkas (film editor) (1913–1980), Hungarian film editor and director, see List of Hungarian films 1901–1947
 Zoltán Farkas (politician) (born 1963), Hungarian politician
 Zoltán Farkas (footballer) (born 1989), Hungarian footballer
 , Hungarian footballer selected for the Hungarian U19 team
 Zoltán Farkas (musician), leader of Hungarian heavy metal band Ektomorf
 Zoltán Farkas (weightlifter) (born 1974), Hungarian weightlifter